Tutu was one of pharaoh's officials during the Amarna letters period 1350–1335 BC. He is only found in the body of letters from Aziru, and his son, DU-Teššup. Four of the Amarna letters—EA 158, 164, 167 and 169—are addressed to the Pharaoh, by way of Tutu. DU-Teššup's single letter is written to pharaoh because his father Aziru is being detained in Egypt, and Aziru is needed to attend to affairs at home. Unless he were to remarry he may never return home again.

Letter EA 164
The undamaged letter EA 164  "Coming, on condition" by Aziru to Tutu is a good example of the intrigues of Aziru in north Canaan, and the involvement of all the local regions, and leaders.

Other letters
EA 158, "Father and son"
EA 164, "Coming, on condition"
EA 167, "The constant Hittite menace"
EA 169, "Aziru in Egypt-(Mizri)" (see DU-Teššup)

See also
DU-Teššup

References 
Moran, William L., The Amarna Letters, Ed. and translated, French, and English, c. 1987, 1992. (softcover)

Amarna letters officials